African black soap, or black soap (also known by various local names such as ose dudu, sabulun salo, and ncha nkota), is a kind of soap originating in West Africa. It is made from the ash of locally harvested African plants and dried peels, which gives the soap its characteristic dark colour. Black soap has become a popular toiletry product in North America. In West Africa, black soap is often made by women using traditional recipes and is often exported through fair trade groups.

Black soap, known as ose-dudu originated with the Yoruba people of Nigeria. A combination of ose-dudu with leaves of the tropical camwood tree (Pterocarpus osun) produces a popular kind of soap with exfoliating properties called dudu-osun. Other varieties from other cultures include sabulun salo, ncha nkota.

Black soap has been found to have some antimicrobial properties against skin microbiota such as Staphylococcus aureus, Escherichia coli and Candida albicans.

Production 
Plant matter, such as plantain skins, palm tree leaves, cocoa pods and shea tree bark, is first sun-dried and then burned to produce ash (which supplies the alkali required to convert or saponify the oils and fats). Next, water and various oils and fats, such as coconut oil, palm oil, and shea butter, are added to the ash. The mixture is cooked and hand-stirred for at least 24 hours. After the soap solidifies, it is scooped out and set out to cure.

References 

Soaps
Acne treatments